The E. R. Neale Medal, named after E. R. Ward Neale, past Geological Association of Canada president, is awarded by the Geological Association of Canada to an individual for sustained outstanding efforts in sharing earth science with Canadians. 

The award recognizes outstanding efforts to communicate and explain geoscience to the public through public lectures, print or electronic media articles, school visits, elementary and secondary school educational materials, field trips, science fairs, and other public communications. The medal is awarded annually, unless no suitable candidate is nominated.

Recipients 
Source: GAC

1995: Godfrey S. Nowlan
1996: Graham L. Williams
1997: Arthur F. King
1998: Alan V. Morgan
1999: P. Tremblay
2000: D. A. B. Pearson
2001: Howard V. Donohoe Jr.
2002: Bob Turner
2003: David Baird
2004: Peter Russell
2005: Fran Haidl
2006: John J. Clague
2007: Dixon Edwards2008: Christy Vodden
2009: Eileen Van der Flier-Keller
2010: Jane Wynne
2011: Randall F. Miller
2012: John Calder
2013: Murray Roed
2014: Ben Gadd
2015: Nick Eyles
2016: Rob Fensome
2017: Guy Narbonne
2018: Mark Fenton
2019: Beth McLarty-Halfkenny (Carleton University)
2020: not awarded
2021: Kylie Williams
2022: Mika McKinnon

See also

 List of geology awards

References

Geological Association of Canada Medals and Awards

Neale
Neale
Neale